Richard Krajicek was the defending champion but did not participate.

Marc Rosset won the title, defeating Yevgeny Kafelnikov 6–4, 6–4 in the final.

Seeds

Draw

Finals

Top half

Bottom half

External links
 Main draw

AXA Cup
AXA Cup